This is a list of dynasties and states that have historically had ties to either ethnic Jews or their religion of Judaism.

In the Land of Israel

 Twelve Tribes of Israel
 Kingdom of Israel (united monarchy), 
 Kingdom of Israel (Samaria), 
 Kingdom of Judah, 
 Hasmonean dynasty, 
Herodian dynasty, 47 BCE–100 CE
 Judean provisional government, 66–68 CE
Bar Kokhba Jewish state, 132–135 CE
 Sassanid-era Jewish self-governance, 614–617 CE (result of the Jewish revolt against Heraclius led by Nehemiah ben Hushiel and Benjamin of Tiberias, which culminated in the Sassanid conquest of Jerusalem)
 State of Israel, 1948 CE–present

In the Jewish diaspora

In Europe
 Khazar Kingdom,  (semi-nomadic Turkic state in the Caucasus whose ruling royal elite seems to have converted to Judaism, although the extent to which it was adopted by commoners is highly debated)
 Medieval French Jewish vassal state, 768–900 CE (purportedly established during the Reconquista; discussed in A Jewish Princedom in Feudal France by Arthur J. Zuckerman)

In the Middle East
 Himyarite Kingdom, 110 BCE–525 CE
Nehardea, 18–33 CE (ruled by Anilai and Asinai of the Parthian Empire)
 Adiabene, 
 Mahoza Kingdom, 495–502 CE (established by Mar-Zutra II)
 Kingdom of Habor (per David Reubeni)

In Africa
 Kingdom of Simien

See also
 List of Hasidic Jewish dynasties
 List of Zoroastrian states and dynasties
 List of Muslim states and dynasties
 List of Sunni Islamic dynasties
 List of Shia Islamic dynasties
 List of Tengrist states and dynasties

References

External links
Jewish History Resource Center -

Historic Jewish communities
Jewish polities
Jewish monarchs
Judaism-related lists
Herodian dynasty
Herodian Tetrarchy
Herodian kingdom
Lists of dynasties